Justin Beresford Higgo  (born 28 September 1968) is a South African-born English barrister and former first-class cricketer.

Higgo was born at Cape Town in September 1968. He later studied classics in England at Christ Church College at the University of Oxford. While studying at Oxford, he made three appearances in first-class cricket for Oxford University in 1989, against Nottinghamshire, Middlesex and Hampshire, scoring a total of 16 runs in his three matches.

After graduating from Oxford, he studied law at City, University of London. He was called to the bar as a member of Gray's Inn in 1995. He is currently a governor at Lancing College, where children were educated.

References

External links

1968 births
Living people
Cricketers from Cape Town
English sportspeople of South African descent
Alumni of Christ Church, Oxford
English cricketers
Oxford University cricketers
Alumni of City, University of London
Members of Gray's Inn
English barristers
21st-century King's Counsel